Crowther Seth is the deputy Governor of Adamawa State, Nigeria. He was a legal adviser to the People's Democratic Party.

References

Living people
Adamawa State politicians
Year of birth missing (living people)